Bodil Schmidt-Nielsen (3 November 1918 – 27 April 2015) was a Danish-born American physiologist, who became the first woman president of the American Physiological Society in 1975.

Biography
Bodil Schmidt-Nielsen was born in Copenhagen, Denmark in 1918, the youngest of four children of two eminent physiologists, the Nobel Laureate August Krogh and Marie Krogh.

In 1939, Bodil Schmidt-Nielsen married Knut Schmidt-Nielsen, a fellow physiologist, and received doctoral degrees in Dentistry, Odontology, and Physiology from the University of Copenhagen. Knut and Bodil Schmidt-Nielsen became a prominent physiology team at Duke University, but divorced in 1966. Bodil became Department Chair at Case Western Reserve University and later devoted her career full-time to research at MDI Biological Laboratory in Maine.

Schmidt-Nielsen died in April 2015 at the age of 96.

Distinguished Mentor and Scientist Award
The Bodil M. Schmidt-Nielsen Distinguished Mentor and Scientist Award honors a member of the American Physiological Society who is judged to have made outstanding contributions to physiological research and demonstrated dedication and commitment to excellence in training of young physiologists.

Selected works
 The Solubility of tooth substance in relation to the composition of saliva (Supplementum; v.2, 1946)
 The resourcefulness of nature in physiological adaptation to the environment (Physiologist 1(2): 4-20, 1958)
 August and Marie Krogh: Lives in Science (1995)

References

1918 births
2015 deaths
American physiologists
Danish emigrants to the United States
People from Copenhagen
University of Copenhagen alumni
Duke University faculty